Amy's Eyes is a children's fantasy novel by Richard Kennedy, published by Harper & Row in 1985, and illustrated by Richard Egielski.

Plot summary
The narrative begins in an orphanage where Amy inadvertently brings her sailor doll to life. It continues on a ship where he has become captain and she has transformed into a doll herself. The book is a principally a coming-of-age tale and a nautical adventure involving pirates and the search for lost treasure. The story contains whimsical elements such as a sailing ship crewed by Mother Goose animals, but also has darker themes including the obsession with Biblical prophecy and numerology.

Reception
The book won the Parents' Choice Picture Book Award in 1985, and was the subject of a major review in The New York Times. The Kirkus Reviews described it as "a treasure hunt of true and false clues and intriguing puzzles, and reads like a breeze".

References

External links
Book review: Amy's Eyes by Richard Kennedy – Scattered Pages essay on rereading the book as an adult

1985 American novels
1985 children's books
1985 fantasy novels
American fantasy novels
Children's fantasy novels
American children's novels
Novels about orphans
Novels set on ships
Sentient toys in fiction
Books illustrated by Richard Egielski
Harper & Row books